Earnest Calvin Rhone (born August 20, 1953) is a former American football linebacker who played ten seasons in the National Football League (NFL) for the Miami Dolphins. He was also an assistant high school football coach at Texas High School from 1993 to 2018.

References

External links
Earnie Rhone at Pro-Football-Reference.com

1953 births
Living people
American football linebackers
Miami Dolphins players
Henderson State Reddies football players
People from Little River County, Arkansas